Eupanacra is a genus of moths in the family Sphingidae.

Species
Eupanacra angulata (Clark, 1923)
Eupanacra automedon (Walker, 1856)
Eupanacra busiris (Walker, 1856)
Eupanacra cadioui Hogenes & Treadaway, 1993
Eupanacra elegantulus (Herrich-Schaffer, 1856)
Eupanacra greetae Cadiou & Holloway, 1989
Eupanacra harmani Cadiou & Holloway, 1989
Eupanacra hollowayi Tennent, 1991
Eupanacra malayana (Rothschild & Jordan, 1903)
Eupanacra metallica (Butler, 1875)
Eupanacra micholitzi (Rothschild & Jordan, 1893)
Eupanacra mindanaensis Brechlin, 2000
Eupanacra mydon (Walker, 1856)
Eupanacra perfecta (Butler, 1875)
Eupanacra poulardi Cadiou & Holloway, 1989
Eupanacra psaltria (Jordan, 1923)
Eupanacra pulchella (Rothschild & Jordan, 1907)
Eupanacra radians (Gehlen, 1930)
Eupanacra regularis (Butler, 1875)
Eupanacra regularis continentalis  (Gehlen, 1930)
Eupanacra sinuata (Rothschild & Jordan, 1903)
Eupanacra splendens (Rothschild, 1894)
Eupanacra splendens paradoxa (Gehlen, 1932)
Eupanacra tiridates (Boisduval, 1875)
Eupanacra treadawayi Cadiou, 1995
Eupanacra variolosa (Walker, 1956)
Eupanacra waloensis Brechlin, 2000

 
Macroglossini
Moth genera